Juan Orlando Robledo Bustos (born 21 August 1979) is a retired Chilean footballer who played as a defender and coach. He is currently the head coach of Mjällby AIF U19.

Club career
After a year in Turkey he returned to Sweden and Mjällby AIF in August 2012, but in December he chose not to extend his contract with the club. In January 2013 he signed for Östers IF. In February 2014, he once again changed teams when he signed with IFK Värnamo.

Coaching career
He began his career with FK Karlskrona.

Honours

Club
Mjällby AIF
 Superettan: 2009

References

External links
 
 
 

1979 births
Living people
Footballers from Santiago
Chilean footballers
Chilean expatriate footballers
Audax Italiano footballers
Unión San Felipe footballers
Santiago Morning footballers
Santiago Wanderers footballers
Kasımpaşa S.K. footballers
Mjällby AIF players
Östers IF players
IFK Värnamo players
FK Karlskrona players
Chilean Primera División players
Allsvenskan players
Superettan players
TFF First League players
Division 2 (Swedish football) players
Ettan Fotboll players
Chilean expatriate sportspeople in Sweden
Chilean expatriate sportspeople in Turkey
Expatriate footballers in Sweden
Expatriate footballers in Turkey
Association football defenders
Chilean football managers
Chilean expatriate football managers
Expatriate football managers in Sweden